Gélinas is a French surname, most prevalent in Canada.

Notable people with this surname include:
 Abeille Gélinas, Canadian DJ
 Alexandre Gélinas, Canadian politician
 Anne-Marie Gélinas, Canadian producer
 Antoine Gélinas-Beaulieu，Canadian skater
 Éric Gélinas, Canadian ice hockey player
 Éveline Gélinas, Canadian actress 
 France Gélinas, Canadian politician
 Gratien Gélinas, Canadian author
 Guillaume Gélinas, Canadian ice hockey player
 Isabelle Gélinas, Canadian actress
 Louis-Philippe Gélinas, Canadian politician
 Martin Gélinas, Canadian ice hockey player
 Mitsou Gélinas, Canadian celebrity
 Pierre Gélinas, Canadian politician